Mridul Machindra Wadhwa (born 1978) is an Indian-born Scottish women's rights, trans rights, and anti-domestic violence campaigner. She serves as Chief Executive Officer of Edinburgh Rape Crisis Centre. She is a member of the Scottish Green Party and was formerly active in the Scottish National Party and a candidate in the 2021 Scottish Parliament election. Since 2019 she has been the target of harassment on social media and from other sources, including racist comments, false accusations, and threats of physical violence.

Background
Mridul Wadhwa was born in India in 1978. She lived in Pune until 30, where she ran a successful business with her husband, then emigrated to the United Kingdom, where she earned a master's degree in education from the University of Edinburgh in 2005. She permanently moved to Scotland in 2009. She became involved in women's rights activism in Scotland as a student, and has spoken about her focus on giving voice to women from marginalised backgrounds, including migrant and racialised women.

Work 
Wadhwa has worked in the equality and anti-violence sectors in Scotland since leaving university in 2005. She was the information and education officer and children's services team leader at Shakti Women's Aid from 2008 to 2017, a training and volunteer coordinator at Rape Crisis Scotland from 2014 to 2018, and the manager at Forth Valley Rape Crisis Centre from 2018 to 2021. She was also a board member of YWCA Scotland and of the Equality Network from 2017 to 2021. She became Chief Executive Officer of Edinburgh Rape Crisis Centre in 2021.

In October 2020, Madhwa announced her Scottish National Party candidacy for MSP for Stirling in the 2021 Scottish Parliament election. Wadhwa quit the party due to what she described as multiple attacks motivated by her interest in leadership positions within the party; according to Wadhwa, her colleagues angrily objected to her being listed on an all-woman candidate list. Wadhwa stated she would still vote for Scottish Independence. She left the SNP after MSPs backed an amendment to allow survivors of rape and sexual violence to pick the sex rather than the gender of the person examining them.

Harassment 

Wadhwa began receiving abuse in 2019, while working as the director of the Forth Valley rape crisis centre in Stirling. The abuse intensified after she announced her candidacy as an SNP MSP in the 2021 Scottish Parliament election, and intensified again after her appointment as director of the Edinburgh Rape Crisis Centre (ERCC). The abuse received at the ERCC included hate speech on social media and on phone calls, letters and emails containing baseless accusations of predatory behaviour, racist commentary, and threats of vigilante violence. Nearly all comments intentionally misgendered Wadhwa. 

Articles attacking Wadhwa were published on the websites of Wings Over Scotland and The Christian Institute, with the series of articles by The Christian Institute amplified by the United States-based Christian Today and Life Site News. Anti-trans YouTuber Kellie-Jay Keen-Minshull released a video which, according to OpenDemocracy, "made a series of unfounded and unevidenced accusations about Wadhwa and her work". After anti-trans activist Graham Linehan published part of Wadhwa's home address, Wadhwa said that for the first time she feared for her life. In August 2021, as part of this harassment campaign, the hashtag #AskRapeCrisisScotland began trending on Twitter and was amplified by For Women Scotland. An analysis by the Trans Safety Network revealed that the approximately 4,800 tweets using the hashtag came from approximately 240 accounts and nearly half came from 30 accounts.

On 13 August 2021, the Scottish Green Party issued a statement in solidarity with Mridul Wadhwa after the abuse, denouncing the spread of misinformation about the crisis centres and resulting abuse which posed a threat to survivors and workers at the centre. By Autumn 2021, as a result of the harassment and following police advice and consultations with security experts, the ERRC ended their open door policy, and installed both an intercom system for access and a reinforced inner door.

Awards
Wadhwa received the "Outstanding Campaigner Award" of the Equality Network in 2015

References

Scottish feminists
Indian feminists
Domestic violence awareness
1978 births
Living people
Scottish political candidates
Indian political candidates
Indian emigrants to Scotland
Transgender women
Indian LGBT politicians
Scottish LGBT politicians